Ji Jin-hee (born June 24, 1971) is a South Korean actor. He is best known for his leading roles in the TV shows Dae Jang Geum (2003), He Who Can't Marry (2009), Dong Yi (2010), Misty (2018) and Designated Survivor: 60 Days (2019).

Career
Ji Jin-hee graduated from Myongji University with a degree in visual design. He was working as a photographer at an advertising agency when a talent agent from SidusHQ approached him about pursuing a career in entertainment. Content at his present job and doubtful that he had any acting talent, Ji refused the offers for a year, but finally agreed when the ad agency downsized during the IMF financial crisis and he got laid off.

In 1999, Ji appeared in the music video for Jo Sung-bin's "Like a Third-rate Movie," and he made his acting debut in 2000 with the television drama Female Secretary. In the next few years, he continued his television career with Juliet's Man (2000), Four Sisters (2001), and the Korean-Japanese co-production Afternoon After the Passing Rain (2002) with Ryoko Yonekura.

Ji made his big screen debut in 2002, playing a detective in the thriller H. This was followed by If You Were Me, a human rights-themed omnibus where he starred in Park Kwang-su's short film Face Value.

He had drawn positive reviews for his portrayal of a surgeon caught up in a love triangle with a priest in the melodrama Love Letter, but Ji's breakthrough came in late 2003 with period drama Dae Jang Geum (also known as Jewel in the Palace). As a Joseon-era government official who falls in love with a female chef turned royal physician (played by Lee Young-ae), Ji's gentlemanly and integrity-filled character attracted female fans across Asia, for not only did Dae Jang Geum receive high viewership ratings domestically (reaching a peak of 57.8%), it also became popular overseas and became one of the proponents of the Korean Wave.

Ji later parlayed his pan-Asian stardom into roles in the Chinese musical film Perhaps Love and the Taiwanese drama The 100th Bride, both in 2005. He next played an amnesiac in Spring Day, the Korean remake of Japanese drama Hoshi no Kinka ("Heaven's Coins").

Fighting against being typecast in "nice" roles after Dae Jang Geum, Ji also played a playboy slacker in romantic comedy series Miss Kim's Million Dollar Quest (2004), for which he received his first acting award. And in black comedy Bewitching Attraction (2006), he was cast as a cartoonist who shares a past with a promiscuous professor.

In 2007, Ji starred in Im Sang-soo's The Old Garden, adapted from Hwang Sok-yong's novel about a couple who meet during the turbulent 1980s surrounding the Gwangju Uprising; he played an anti-government activist who gets released from prison after serving 17 years for his political activities. This was followed by Ji's first action film, Yoichi Sai's Soo, in which he played dual roles as a hired killer who avenges the death of his twin brother.

Ji returned to television in 2008, as a veteran news reporter in Spotlight. In 2009, he played a fussy, 40-year-old bachelor architect in He Who Can't Marry, the Korean remake of Japanese drama Kekkon Dekinai Otoko ("The Man Who Can't Get Married"). Ji next appeared in the Korean-Japanese "telecinema" Paradise, which both received a theatrical release and aired on SBS and TV Asahi.

He also published Ji Jin-hee in Italy: A Walk in the Clouds, which featured photos and essays about his travels in Rome, Florence and Milan, as well as Ji's recommendations and tips about wine.

In 2010, Ji starred in Parallel Life, playing Korea's youngest ever chief presiding judge, who upon his wife's murder discovers that his life may exactly replicate that of someone who died 30 years ago. He was next cast as a music critic and radio show host who goes in search of his missing spouse in the road trip comedy Looking for My Wife (also known as Runaway from Home).

Then Ji reunited with Dae Jang Geum television director Lee Byung-hoon in another period drama Dong Yi, which also proved popular with audiences. As King Sukjong, who falls for a palace maid (played by Han Hyo-joo) and makes her his royal concubine, Ji said he wanted to show a monarch who had "weak spots that show through his charismatic exterior. Rather than being a dignified king, he is an outgoing and adventurous character."

Ji continued playing leading roles in television, as an airline pilot in Take Care of Us, Captain (2012), general and Joseon dynasty founder Yi Seong-gye in The Great Seer (2012), an adulterous husband in One Warm Word (2013), and a villainous doctor in Blood (2015). He also wrote the original draft of the screenplay of horror-comedy Ghost Sweepers (2012), for which he received a story by credit.

From 2014 to 2015, Ji starred in three Chinese films, namely: On the Way opposite Eva Huang, in which a recently divorced Korean man meets a Chinese woman on a train while traveling in China; Bad Sister opposite Ivy Chen, a romantic comedy where a father who wants to stop his daughter's wedding teams up with the groom's equally disapproving older sister; and Helios, a crime thriller about the theft of nuclear weapons by a group of terrorists.

Filmography

Film

Television series

Variety shows

Music videos

Discography

Book

Awards and nominations

References

External links
 
 
 

1971 births
IHQ (company) artists
Living people
South Korean male television actors
South Korean male film actors
21st-century South Korean male actors
People from Seoul
Chungju Ji clan